This is a list of women who stood in general elections to the Parliament of the United Kingdom up to and including the 1945 general election.

Summary of general election candidates 

Unionist candidates or MPs in Scottish constituencies were counted as Conservatives.

Election results

1918 UK general election

By-elections, 1918-1922

1922 UK general election

By-elections, 1922-1923

1923 UK general election

Jewson was elected by taking second place in a two-seat constituency.

1924 UK general election

By-elections, 1924-1929

1929 UK general election

Rathbone was elected by taking second place in a two-seat constituency.

By-elections, 1929-1931

1931 UK general election

Horsbrugh was elected by taking second place in a two-seat constituency.

By-elections, 1931-1935

1935 UK general election

By-elections, 1935-1945

1945 UK general election

Castle won in Blackburn by taking second place in a two-seat constituency.

See also
 List of female Members of the House of Commons of the United Kingdom
 Parliament (Qualification of Women) Act 1918
 Women in the House of Commons of the United Kingdom

References

F. W. S. Craig, British Parliamentary Election Results 1918-1949

Further reading
 Women Members of Parliament

Women
House of Commons of the United Kingdom
Women in the United Kingdom